Faisal Khalil Sebait Mubarak Al-Junaibi (born 4 December 1982) is an Emirati footballer who plays as a centre forward for Al-Hamriyah and formerly for the UAE national football team.

Club career

Al Ahli

2009–10
Faisal did not play this season because of injury he suffered in the final of the Super Cup on September 23, 2009 against Al Ain FC and Al Ahli which lost on Penalties.

On 8 February 2010, Faisal Said That he will Move to one of the top teams soon (Al Ain, Al Wahda, Al Jazira), and he say that his contract expires this season, While Al Ahli, says he does not have the right to negotiate Faisal any other club since his contract will expire next year.

On 18 August 2010, Faisal Khalil renews his contract with Al Ahli .and he says " This Period i have witnessed that some of the gossip is not true in the media in general and the boards and forums about the sports player Faisal Khalil and non-renewal with Al Ahli and are not official sources "and he continued," that the renewal of Faisal today with the Al Ahli is a response to skeptics."
Mr Hamad Al Ahli Club's Manager says "In the process and negotiate with the player and sign him did not take a lot of time and there was a genuine desire from Faisal for renewal, and a sincere desire of the Governing Council to take into account the player's future and preserve their rights, "and" there is still al-Ahli club house is great sons who nursed and taught him from a young age and instilled in them a love theme, jealousy and loyalty to the fans of the great public, which commutes stars all the love and appreciation. "
Faisal Khalil Continues and Says "The public who was seen by Faisal look wrong that they will change it, the question of renewal was a matter of time this is for illustration only, "said Faisal," I am like a fish can not live out of water in a reference that he can not live outside the walls of the Red Castle " 
He drew Faisal message to the Al Ahli Public at the end of his Renewal "Faisal is in the home and between a quarter and his brothers and loved ones, and I are not described today, and will keep working our players as a group to make them happy and the introduction of joy in themselves, victories and complete joy when he announced an end to my career in football with the horsemen."

Honours

Individual
 Sheikh Majid Football Season Award best Emirati player : 2007/2008
 UAE League Top Scorer : 2007/2008

Club
Al Ahli FC
UAE League: 2005/2006, 2008/2009.
UAE President Cup:  2002, 2004, 2008.

International
United Arab Emirates
 Gulf Cup of Nations : 2007

Notes

1982 births
Living people
Emirati footballers
Emirati expatriate footballers
United Arab Emirates international footballers
Association football forwards
Al Ahli Club (Dubai) players
LB Châteauroux players
Al-Wasl F.C. players
Al-Shaab CSC players
Al Hamriyah Club players
2007 AFC Asian Cup players
People from the Emirate of Sharjah
Footballers at the 2002 Asian Games
UAE Pro League players
UAE First Division League players
Asian Games competitors for the United Arab Emirates
Expatriate footballers in France
Emirati expatriate sportspeople in France